Coltriciella is a genus of fungi in the family Hymenochaetaceae.

Species list

Coltriciella corticicola
Coltriciella dependens
Coltriciella navispora
Coltriciella oblectabilis
Coltriciella pusilla
Coltriciella pusilla
Coltriciella subpictae
Coltriciella tasmanica

Hymenochaetaceae
Agaricomycetes genera